EUI may refer to:
 Electronically controlled unit injector
 Energy use intensity
 European unemployment insurance
 European University Institute, in Florence, Italy
 Extended Unique Identifier
 Europa Universalis, the first instalment within the Europa Universalis video game series